Cotycuara is a genus of longhorn beetles of the subfamily Lamiinae, containing the following species:

 Cotycuara albomarginata Galileo & Martins, 2004
 Cotycuara crinita Galileo & Martins, 2005
 Cotycuara viridis Galileo & Martins, 2005

References

Hemilophini